The Kolbenspitze is a mountain in the Texel group of the Ötztal Alps.

Mountains of South Tyrol
Mountains of the Alps
Ötztal Alps